Paul Cuneo (1938–2014) was an Australian rugby league footballer who played in the 1950s and 1960s for Newtown and North Sydney Bears in the NSWRL competition.

Playing career
Cuneo began his first grade career for North Sydney in 1957.  In 1961, Cuneo was selected to represent NSW City against NSW Country.  Cuneo spent a total of 6 seasons at Norths before switching to Newtown in 1963.  Cuneo played his one and only finals game for Newtown in 1966 against Manly which ended in a 10-9 loss.  Cuneo retired at the end of 1969 after 119 first grade games.  He then went on to coach the Newtown reserve grade side in the following years.  He died on 7 January 2014.

References

1938 births
2014 deaths
Australian rugby league players
Newtown Jets players
North Sydney Bears players
City New South Wales rugby league team players
Rugby league centres
Rugby league props
Rugby league players from Sydney